Angela Margaret Mason  (born 9 August 1944) is a British civil servant and activist, and a former director of the UK-based lesbian, gay, bisexual and transgender lobbying organisation Stonewall. She is a former Chair of the Fawcett Society, a UK women's rights campaigning organisation and a Labour Party councillor in Camden.

Early life

Born Angela Margaret Weir in High Wycombe in Buckinghamshire, she grew up on the Isle of Sheppey and was educated at Basingstoke High School, Bedford College, University of London, and the London School of Economics. She was an early member of the Gay Liberation Front in the UK.

Terrorism charges
She was one of the Stoke Newington Eight, who in 1972 were charged with planting or sending bombs which aimed to maim or kill government Ministers, their families and Conservative Party officials. She was one of the four accused who was acquitted following a long and still controversial trial. Mason still refuses to discuss the trial in interviews 

Mason was an activist in the trade union and radical movements.

Career after Angry Brigade
Mason became a lecturer at the LSE then the Principal Solicitor for the London Borough of Camden. She became a member of gay rights organisation Stonewall in 1989, becoming its director in 1992.

In government
From 2003 to 2007, she was the director of the UK government's Women and Equality Unit, now the Government Equalities Office, with her high salary attracting media attention. Mason has also been a member of the Equal Opportunities Commission and an advisor to the Mayor of London, Ken Livingstone. Controversially she used her position as a senior civil servant to oppose one measure of legislative equality for gay people – protections against discrimination in the delivery of public and commercial services – in 2005 and 2006. She was, however, unsuccessful and the measure was passed in the Equality Act 2006. She was awarded the OBE in 1999 and promoted to CBE in 2007.

Since 2007 she has been an advisor to IDeA, a government quango which provides guidelines and regulations for all local authorities in England on equality issues. She was also appointed as Chair of the feminist group the Fawcett Society in the same year.

In 2010, she was elected as a Labour councillor to Camden London Borough Council; she represented the borough's Cantelowes ward. She served as Deputy Leader of the borough council, and cabinet member for sustainability but was dismissed from the roles in May 2011. She was, however, reappointed to the Council's Cabinet the following year, and was Cabinet Member for Children until her retirement from the council in 2022.

Personal life
Mason married scriptwriter William Mason in 1971, they divorced in 1980 with Mason retaining her married surname. She is in a Civil Partnership with Marxist academic Elizabeth Wilson and has a daughter who was conceived by artificial insemination.

Later life
 The archives of Angela Mason and Elizabeth Wilson are held at The Women's Library at the Library of the London School of Economics, ref 7EAW.

See also
 The Angry Brigade
 Stonewall (charity)

References

External links
 The Women's Library at the Library of the London School of Economics

1944 births
British civil servants
British LGBT rights activists
Living people
British LGBT businesspeople
Commanders of the Order of the British Empire
Alumni of Bedford College, London
Alumni of the London School of Economics
Councillors in the London Borough of Camden
Gay Liberation Front members
Labour Party (UK) councillors
People from High Wycombe
Honorary Fellows of the London School of Economics
English LGBT politicians
21st-century LGBT people
Women councillors in England